Emilia Vătășoiu-Liță (born 20 October 1933) is a Romanian retired artistic gymnast. She competed at the 1956, 1960 and 1964 Olympics and 1958 World Championships and won team bronze medals in 1956, 1958 and 1960.

Vătășoiu took up gymnastics in 1951, and in 1954 was included to the national team. After retiring from competitions she worked as a gymnastics coach and international referee.

References

External links

 

1933 births
Living people
People from Vâlcea County
Romanian female artistic gymnasts
Olympic gymnasts of Romania
Olympic bronze medalists for Romania
Olympic medalists in gymnastics
Gymnasts at the 1956 Summer Olympics
Gymnasts at the 1960 Summer Olympics
Gymnasts at the 1964 Summer Olympics
Medalists at the 1956 Summer Olympics
Medalists at the 1960 Summer Olympics
Medalists at the World Artistic Gymnastics Championships
20th-century Romanian women